Enteng Kabisote 3: Okay Ka, Fairy Ko: The Legend Goes On and On and On is a comedy, fantasy and action film released in 2006, the third installment of the Enteng Kabisote film series, and the fifth movie installment based on TV sitcom, Okay Ka, Fairy Ko!

Synopsis
Enteng Kabisote (Vic Sotto) has a reason to gloat: business is thriving, so he thinks Ina Magenta (Giselle Toengi) will get off his case for once. And she does, but for an entirely different reason: her newest cosmetic trick is a disaster, and it's affecting the whole of Engkantasya. Satana (Bing Loyzaga) sees this as the perfect opportunity to put her plans in place, starting with a lizard who poses as Enteng. The Kabisotes must keep together even as they deal with domestic problems so that they can fight as a family against evil.

Cast
 Vic Sotto as Enteng Kabisote/Lizardman
 Kristine Hermosa as Faye Kabisote 
 Giselle Tongi as Ina Magenta
 Allan K. as Gay Ina Magenta
 Aiza Seguerra as Aiza Kabisote 
 Oyo Boy Sotto as Benok Kabisote
 Bing Loyzaga as Satana
 Bayani Casimiro II as Prinsipe K
 Mikylla Remirez as Ada Kabisote
 Joey de Leon  as Shintaro Gokoyami
 Jose Manalo as Jose
 Ruby Rodriguez as Amy
 Antonio Aquitania as Zarkov
 Paolo Ballesteros as Pao
 Ciara Sotto as Sha
 BJ Forbes as Dingding
 Pia Guanio as Darling
 Cassandra Ponti as Amazona 1
 Ehra Madrigal as Amazona 2
 Angelica Jones as Munitana (From the raise of Munita)
 Alyssa Alano as Lukasta (From the raise of Luka)
 Sugar Mercado as May
 JC Parker as June
 Ella V as April
 Tito Sotto as Nador
 Jimmy Santos as Boy ng mga Batang Digmaan
 Paul Salas
 Jinky Oda as Bale (cameo)

Awards

See also
 Okay Ka, Fairy Ko! (film series)

References

External links
 

Enteng Kabisote
2006 films
2000s fantasy comedy films
Philippine fantasy comedy films
OctoArts Films films
M-Zet Productions films
2006 comedy films
Films directed by Tony Y. Reyes